The Samsung Galaxy Camera is a point-and-shoot camera which is an Android based mobile device. Samsung announced the camera in August 2012, with the slogan "Camera. Reborn." The device was officially released on 8 November 2012, with web sales beginning on 7 November.

Specifications
The camera features a 16 megapixel CMOS sensor and a 21x optical zoom lens, as well as Wi-Fi and 3G connectivity, and a GPS receiver by which the camera can make geotagged photographs. It runs on Android's 4.1 "Jelly Bean" software and it allows for in-camera organizing, editing and online sharing or storage of images and videos. As with other Android devices, other software can be downloaded from Google Play. However, voice calls cannot be made on the Galaxy Camera. This feature would be provided in its successor, the Samsung Galaxy S4 Zoom.

Marketing
To promote the Galaxy Camera, Samsung released a viral video on their YouTube channel, featuring James Franco demonstrating the camera's features.

Availability
On October 4, 2012, U.S. wireless provider AT&T announced that it would begin to carry the Galaxy Camera through its retail outlets on November 16.

On December 11, 2012, Verizon announced that it will also carry the Galaxy Camera. It will be the first 4G LTE camera. The camera was discontinued in 2014.

Models
Although the Galaxy Camera started as a single camera, the branded concept was expanded to include multiple iterations of digital camera, with the Android OS being the unifying feature.
As of February 2016, the range of galaxy camera includes (and has included):
 Galaxy Camera
 Samsung Galaxy Camera 2
 Samsung Galaxy NX

Modifications 
Members of XDA Developers have added the possibility to boot from an microSD card.

Gallery

Reception 
The idea of the camera was received favorable, but the execution less.

References 

Galaxy Camera
Android cameras with optical zoom
Point-and-shoot cameras
Cameras introduced in 2012
Mobile phones with mechanical zoom lens